NMF may refer to:
 Non-negative matrix factorization
 National Medical Fellowships,  a nonprofit organization providing scholarships and awards to underrepresented minority medical students in the United States
 Neuenfelder Maschinenfabrik, a German company for ship cranes
 N-Methylformamide
 New Myanmar Foundation, a civil society organisation foundation in Myanmar
 New minor forcing, a contract bridge bidding convention
 Neural modeling field, a mathematical framework for machine learning
 Nippon Music Foundation, an organisation to develop international networks of music and foster public interest in music in Japan
 Green Warriors of Norway (Norwegian: Norges Miljøvernforbund), a Norwegian environmental NGO
 Norman Music Festival, an annual three-day American music festival Norman, Oklahoma